Lawrence Dundas, 1st Marquess of Zetland,  (16 August 1844 – 11 March 1929), known as Lawrence Dundas until 1873 and as the Earl of Zetland from 1873 to 1892, was a British Conservative statesman. He was Lord Lieutenant of Ireland between 1889 and 1892.

Background, education and military service
He was born in London, the son of John Charles Dundas, younger son of Lawrence Dundas, 1st Earl of Zetland (Zetland is an archaic spelling of Shetland). His mother was Margaret Matilda, daughter of James Talbit. He was educated at Harrow and Trinity College, Cambridge, being commissioned as a Cornet in the Royal Horse Guards in 1866.

Political career
By 1869 a Lieutenant, Zetland retired from the British Army in 1872 and was elected Member of Parliament for Richmond, North Yorkshire that same year. However, he sat in the House of Commons for less than a year before succeeding his uncle as third Earl of Zetland. A Lord in Waiting from May to September 1880, Lord Zetland subsequently moved from supporting the Liberals to joining the Conservative Party in 1884. In 1889 he was sent to Ireland as Lord Lieutenant. The same year he was appointed a Knight of the Order of Saint Patrick (KP). In the post he proved both successful and popular, and remained there until the Liberals returned to power in 1892. He was sworn of the Privy Council in 1889 and in 1892, on Lord Salisbury's recommendation, he was created Earl of Ronaldshay, in the County of Orkney and Zetland, and Marquess of Zetland.

In the 1890s Lord Zetland became more involved in local politics, becoming an alderman on the North Riding of Yorkshire County Council in 1894 and being elected Mayor of Richmond in 1895 and 1896. In 1900 he was made a Knight of the Thistle. A freemason like his uncle and grandfather, Zetland was the society's provincial Grand Master in the North and East Riding of Yorkshire from 1874 to 1923. He was also an enthusiastic sportsman, and was Master of the Zetland Hunt for thirty-five years.

Family
Lord Zetland married Lady Lilian Selina Elizabeth Lumley, daughter of Richard Lumley, 9th Earl of Scarbrough, in 1871. He died in March 1929, aged 84, at Aske Hall, Yorkshire, and was buried there. His eldest surviving son Lawrence succeeded him. The Marchioness of Zetland died in December 1943. They had five children:

Lady Hilda Mary Dundas (b. 24 Nov 1872 - d. 19 May 1957) married Charles Henry FitzRoy, 4th Baron Southampton on 9 July 1892.
Thomas Dundas, Lord Dundas (b. 19 Jan 1874 -  d. 11 Feb 1874)
Lawrence John Lumley Dundas, 2nd Marquess of Zetland (b. 11 Jun 1876 - d. 6 Feb 1961)
Lady Maud Frederica Elizabeth Dundas (b. 9 Jul 1877 - d. 15 Mar 1967) married William Wentworth-Fitzwilliam, 7th Earl Fitzwilliam on 24 June 1896.
Lord George Heneage Lawrence Dundas (b. 1 Jul 1882 - d. 30 Sep 1968) married Iris Winifred Hanley on 23 December 1905.

Notes

References

External links

Zetland Estates

1844 births
1929 deaths
People educated at Harrow School
Alumni of Trinity College, Cambridge
Lords Lieutenant of Ireland
Dundas, Lawrence
Royal Horse Guards officers
Conservative Party (UK) hereditary peers
Knights of the Thistle
Members of North Riding County Council
Dundas, Lawrence
Zetland, M1
UK MPs who were granted peerages
Liberal Party (UK) Lords-in-Waiting
Members of the Privy Council of the United Kingdom
Marquesses of Zetland
Mayors of Richmond, North Yorkshire
Peers of the United Kingdom created by Queen Victoria